Nienburg, meaning "new castle", may refer to the following locations in Germany:

Nienburg (district), Lower Saxony
Nienburg, Lower Saxony
Nienburg station
Nienburg II – Schaumburg, a German parliament constituency
Nienburg, Saxony-Anhalt
Nienburg Abbey, a Benedictine monastery
Nienburg (Verwaltungsgemeinschaft), a collective municipality, disbanded in 2010